Hilltop is a city in Anoka County, Minnesota, United States. The population was 744 at the 2010 census.

The city is a small enclave within the city of Columbia Heights and consists of 16 city blocks. Minnesota State Highway 65 (Central Avenue) serves as a main route, running on the town's eastern edge.

The majority of the town's residents live in the 263 mobile homes, across four trailer parks, that sit within the city's borders.  Hilltop is one of only two incorporated cities in Minnesota that consist primarily of manufactured housing; the second is another Twin Cities suburb, Landfall.

Geography

Hilltop is an enclave within Columbia Heights.

History
The land where Hilltop exists was originally an unincorporated part of the former Fridley Township, a civil township next to the city of Fridley.  The land had a dairy farm and later was the Oak Grove Riding Academy and Stables.  The first trailer park, Trailer City, opened on the land in the 1940s; another park, Sunnyside, soon opened next door.  Residents of two trailer parks became concerned that the township was planning to remove the mobile homes. In 1956, led by Trailer City Park owner Les Johnson, they approached neighboring Columbia Heights and requested to be annexed by the city. Columbia Heights turned down their request, so Johnson circulated a petition to have the residents vote on incorporation.  The petition for incorporation passed smoothly, 137 to 34, and Hilltop was created. The city was named after a nearby drive-in cinema.

Columbia Heights soon annexed all the land surrounding Hilltop, and began to make antagonistic moves towards the young town, at one point threatening to halt Hilltop's water and sewer service for punitive reasons.  Another item of conflict was Hilltop's plan to issue liquor licenses, which would compete with Columbia Heights' own municipal liquor store that accounted for a third of the city's operating budget.  Instead of initially contracting with Columbia Heights, Hilltop opted to contract its fire protection from Fridley and establish its own police department by hiring a retired highway patrolman as police chief and three part-time officers. By 1959, tensions rose to the point where the Metropolitan Municipalities Commission, a predecessor of the Twin Cities-wide Metropolitan Council, asked the then-State Attorney General Walter Mondale to contest the Hilltop charter to the Minnesota Supreme Court.

Hilltop's first mayor was William Wychor, who instituted ordinances prohibiting activities such as "fortune tellers and other such like imposters"; "a person known to be a pickpocket, thief, burglar, yeggman, or confidence man and having no visible or lawful means of support"; and anyone "procuring or attempting to solicit money or any other thing of value by falsely pretending and representing himself to be blind, deaf, dumb, without arms or legs, or to be otherwise physically deficient".

By 1961, Hilltop was growing in population and tax revenue after attracting construction of a strip mall including a supermarket, drugstore, and liquor store, in addition to a bowling alley (with liquor license) and motel.  Media in Columbia Heights began insinuating that Hilltop's liquor licenses were illegal, but were unable to provide evidence. The town constructed its own water tower in the mid-1960s, which allowed it to tap the Minneapolis water supply and end its conflict with Columbia Heights. In 1967, the town's population had doubled from inception to 1,039.  Tension between the rival cities began to abate in 1968, when Hilltop mayor Vivian Caesar and Columbia Heights mayor Bruce Nawrocki met alongside their respective city councils to discuss mutual issues.  The city's police department closed in 1972, when one of its officers drove the town's only squad car into a tree and ruined their only source of transportation.  Unable to afford a replacement, the police department was disbanded and the town instead paid the Columbia Heights Police Department for service; rescue services were also contracted to Columbia Heights on a per-incident fee.

The city led the Twin Cities area in population loss during the 1970s, going from a high of 1,015 to 817 in 1980.  Due to the town's small size and the fascination with the trailer park stereotype, what were sometimes smaller incidents caused major headlines in the media of the area.  In 1970, then-mayor George Reiter attempted to replace the female village clerk because he believed men were temperamentally better suited for the position, a view held by many of his supporters in the city.  Murders were especially troubling for the residents.  In 1976, there was a triple homicide in the city, perpetrated by Edwin Clay Hull and Ronald D. Gilbert – both received life sentences. In 1980, three prison escapees were captured hiding out in the trailer of one of their mothers; and in 1987, there was a murder-suicide involving a brother and sister.

In 1991, city manager Karen Danz, who had stood in the position for 20 years, was arrested and convicted of embezzling over $200,000 from the city treasury.  With an annual budget of only $250,000 at the time, the crisis nearly drove the city to bankruptcy and jeopardized its police protection agreement with Columbia Heights.  The city was ultimately saved by insurance and a fidelity bond.  In 1995, the city received more unwanted attention when the Star Tribune carried a headline that "Tiny Hilltop is Crime Capital" due to its 131 serious crimes in 1994, which worked out to one for every six residents.

Government

Hilltop's government consists of a mayor and a four-person city council.  The city manager is the town's only full-time employee.  As of 2003, the mayor's salary was $300 a month, and council members received $250 a month.

Police services are contracted to Columbia Heights Police Department based on an annual fee; rescue services are also handled by Columbia Heights on a per-incident fee.  Fire department services are contracted to the Columbia Heights Fire Department.

Demographics

2010 census
As of the census of 2010, there were 744 people, 380 households, and 151 families residing in the city. The racial makeup of the city was 71.0% White, 11.3% African American, 1.6% Native American, 2.7% Asian, 6.9% from other races, and 6.6% from two or more races. Hispanic or Latino of any race were 16.9% of the population.

There were 380 households, of which 25.0% had children under the age of 18 living with them, 17.9% were married couples living together, 14.2% had a female householder with no husband present, 7.6% had a male householder with no wife present, and 60.3% were non-families. 47.4% of all households were made up of individuals, and 11.3% had someone living alone who was 65 years of age or older. The average household size was 1.96 and the average family size was 2.82.

The median age in the city was 42.7 years. 20.3% of residents were under the age of 18; 7.7% were between the ages of 18 and 24; 25.4% were from 25 to 44; 35.9% were from 45 to 64; and 10.6% were 65 years of age or older. The gender makeup of the city was 53.2% male and 46.8% female.

2000 census
As of the census of 2000, there were 766 people, 400 households, and 165 families residing in the city. The racial makeup of the city was 82.64% White, 6.66% African American, 3.00% Native American, 3.39% Asian, 0.65% from other races, and 3.66% from two or more races. Hispanic or Latino of any race were 5.35% of the population.

There were 400 households, out of which 23.8% had children under the age of 18 living with them, 17.8% were married couples living together, 19.0% had a female householder with no husband present, and 58.8% were non-families. 51.5% of all households were made up of individuals, and 8.3% had someone living alone who was 65 years of age or older.  The average household size was 1.89 and the average family size was 2.69.

In the city, the population was spread out, with 20.9% under the age of 18, 9.7% from 18 to 24, 35.0% from 25 to 44, 26.2% from 45 to 64, and 8.2% who were 65 years of age or older.  The median age was 36 years. For every 100 females, there were 103.2 males.  For every 100 females age 18 and over, there were 104.0 males.

The median income for a household in the city was $26,528, and the median income for a family was $32,875. Males had a median income of $28,295 versus $25,652 for females. The per capita income for the city was $16,576.  About 17.7% of families and 21.4% of the population were below the poverty line, including 28.9% of those under age 18 and 10.3% of those age 65 or over. For those 85 and older (4.29%), they accounted for an average of income $6,693 and were 96.4% Caucasian, 1.5% African American, .4% Hispanic and .3% Indian.

References

External links
 City of Hilltop Official Website

Cities in Anoka County, Minnesota
Cities in Minnesota